The 2020-21 Kategoria e Dytë was the 49th official season of the Albanian football third division since its establishment. There were 27 teams competing this season, split in 2 groups. The winners of the groups played the league's final against each other and also gained promotion to the 2021-22 Kategoria e Parë. Teams ranked from the 2nd to the 5th position qualified to the play-off round which they played against the 7th ranked teams in the 2020-21 Kategoria e Parë. Butrinti, Maliqi, Shkumbini and Tërbuni were promoted to the 2021–22 Kategoria e Parë. Shkumbini won their second Kategoria e Dytë title after beating Maliqi in the final match.

Changes from last season

Team changes

From Kategoria e Dytë
Promoted to Kategoria e Parë:
 Partizani B
 Tomori
 Vora

To Kategoria e Dytë
Relegated from Kategoria e Parë:
 Devolli
 Iliria
 Shënkolli
 Shkumbini
 Tërbuni

Promoted from Kategoria e Tretë:
 Bulqiza
 Labëria
 Valbona

Locations

Stadia by capacity and locations

Group A

Group B

League standings

Group A

Results

Group B

Results

Final

Group A Promotion play-offs
<onlyinclude>

Semi-finals

Tërbuni qualified to the final as the team with the better ranking.

Final

Tërbuni qualified to the final play-off match.

Group B Promotion play-offs
<onlyinclude>

Semi-finals

Final

Butrinti qualified to the final play-off match.

Relegation play-offs

Both teams remained in their respective leagues.

Season statistics

Scoring

Top scorers

References

3
Albania
Kategoria e Dytë seasons